The Roly Poly Man is a 1994 Australian feature film.

Production
It was funded through private investment, The Film Finance Corporation and the NSW Film and Television Office. Its budget was just under $1,000.000.

Cast 
 Paul Chubb as Dirk Trent
 Les Foxcroft as Mickey
 Susan Lyons as Sandra Burnett
 Zoe Bertram as Laurel Trent
 Frank Whitten as Dr. Henderson
 Peter Braunstein as Det. Tom McKenzie
 John Batchelor as Axel
 Rowan Woods as Prof. Wauchop
 Jane Harders as Jane Lewis
 Valerie Bader as Motel Manager
 Sarah Lambert as Vicki Lane
 Deborah Kennedy as Chantal
 Jim Pike as Tony
 Exploding White Mice as Thrash Rock Band
 Roy Billing as Sidebottom
 Barbara Stephens as Nun
 Kylie Jane Green as School Girl
 Bruce Venables as Security Guard
 Laura Gabriel as Nurse
 Marie Armstrong as Wife
 Bill Vince as Husband
 Robert Bruning as Garfield
 Tony Poli as Gary (billed as Toni Poli)
 Dan Wyllie as Aggro Graffitist (billed as Daniel Wyllie)
 Dorothy Blayney as Intact Graffitist
 Jim Burnett as Ted Lewis
 Vic Andrews as Detective 2
 Alan Hornery as Bus Driver
 Paul LePetit as Barfly
 Alan Chappell as Elvis (billed as Alan Chapple)
 John Winter as Woozy Bear
 Kym Goldsworthy as Mr. Clocky
 Joanna Moore as Miss Rhonda
 Richard Morecroft as Newsreader

Reception
Even though the film didn't perform well at the box office, it had a healthy life in film festival appearances, television sales, DVD, and sales to a number of international territories (Italy and South Africa).

It is one of the more unusual films made in Australia, as it combined schlock, critters, film noir and splatter to create an 'out there' type of comedy that appealed to a niche audience.

The film won the Vincent Price Award (Audience Award) at the XVth Fantafestival in Rome, Italy in June 1995. Other festivals it screened at include Mysfest (Italy) where it was nominated for Best Film, Durban Film Festival (South Africa), Vancouver Film Festival (Canada), Love and Anarchy Festival (Helsinki), Australian Film Festival (AFI), Bathurst Film Festival (Australia), Tromso International Festival (Norway), L'Etrange Festival (France), and Cycle du Cinema Australien (France). The film was nominated for a Best Original Screenplay at the 1994 AFI Awards.

The Roly Poly Man's director, actor/director Bill Young, co-directed the documentary A Very Short War.

References

External links
 
The Roly Poly Man at Oz Movies
 

Australian crime comedy films
1994 films
1990s English-language films
1990s Australian films